Marlapalem is a village in Gannavaram Mandal in Krishna district of Andhra Pradesh, India.

References

Villages in Krishna district